Harry Bradshaw (22 January 1895 – after 1923) was an English footballer.

He was a goalkeeper at South Liverpool before moving to Tranmere Rovers. He played every game for Tranmere in the 1921–22 season, their first in the Football League. In 1923 he moved to Ellesmere Port Cement.

References

1895 births
20th-century deaths
Year of death missing
Footballers from Liverpool
English footballers
Association football goalkeepers
South Liverpool F.C. players
Tranmere Rovers F.C. players
Ellesmere Port Cement F.C. players
English Football League players